"Big Iron" is a country ballad written and performed by Marty Robbins, originally released as an album track on Gunfighter Ballads and Trail Songs in September 1959, then as a single in February 1960 with the song "Saddle Tramp" as the B-side single. Members of the Western Writers of America chose it as one of the Top 100 Western songs of all time.

It tells the story of an Arizona Ranger's duel with an outlaw named Texas Red in the "town of Agua Fria". The townspeople predict the death of the ranger; an unconcerned Texas Red having already killed "one and nineteen" men, but at the moment they meet, the ranger kills Texas Red with the "big iron on his hip." The ranger's draw was so swift, that Texas Red had not even "cleared leather," killing the outlaw in one shot.

Robbins's version of the song reached number 5 on the Billboard Country chart and number 26 on the Billboard Hot 100 chart in April 1960. The B-side, "Saddle Tramp" was not included on Gunfighter Ballads, but was later placed on Robbins' 1966 LP The Drifter.

The song is also featured in the 2010 video game Fallout: New Vegas on the in-game radio stations, 'Mojave Music Radio', ‘Black Mountain Radio’ and 'Radio New Vegas'. The popularity of the game helped spur a revival of interest in Robbins' music in the 21st century. In the decade following the video game's release, "Big Iron" became an Internet meme, gaining popularity through remixes and Photoshop parodies as well as its use on YouTube.

Inspiration 
The eponymous "Big Iron" was built by Andy Anderson in his Fast Draw Holster shop from parts. It was on a Great Western frame with a 12" barrel made from an 1892 Winchester rifle or carbine barrel in .44 WCF. Andy was 6'4" with large hands. He put Colt 1860 Army grips on his personal SA revolvers, and this gun has an original grip frame from an 1860 Army. The cylinder is a Great Western cylinder chambered for .44 Magnum.

Robbins happened to be in the shop the day a customer bought the gun. The customer was also a very large man, and Robbins was fascinated by his fast drawing the Buntline. One week later, Andy Anderson received in the mail a record of Big Iron; Robbins wrote the song after seeing this gun. Andy Anderson additionally had a personal gun he called Big Iron, a Colt S.A. .44 Special with 7 1/2" barrel out of his own favorite rig, the "AA", a high rise version of his Walk & Draw Western.

The gun that served to inspire this song currently resides in a private collection.

The ranger referenced is based on a ranger named Joseph Pearce, who was an Arizona Ranger born in 1873. On November 23, 1903, Joe enrolled in the Arizona Rangers in Douglas, Arizona. He worked with the Rangers for a brief but illustrious career before quitting in 1905. Following his service, he worked as a line rider for six years before being appointed chief of Apache police on the Fort Apache Reservation. He was a skilled trailer, and because he preferred to work alone, the Indians called him "Lone Wolf", much like the ranger in the song.

Personnel
 Marty Robbins - singer
 The Glaser Brothers - backing vocals
 Bob Moore - bass
 Grady Martin - lead guitar
 Jack H. Pruett - guitar
 Louis Dunn - drums
 Don Law - production
 M.C. Rather - sound mastering
 Hollis Flatt - sound mastering

Charts

In albums
Gunfighter Ballads and Trail Songs (September 1959), a compilation, CL 1349 - mono, CS 8158 - stereo, PC 8158
More Greatest Hits (April 1961), CL 1635 - mono, CS 8435 - stereo, PC 8435
Bend in the River (1968), D 445 - mono (Columbia Musical Treasuries), DS 445 - stereo
The Heart of Marty Robbins (1969), STS 2016 (Columbia Star Series)
All Time Greatest Hits (August 1972), CG 31361, KG 31361, C 31361
Marty! (1972 - 5 record set), P5S 5812 (Columbia Musical Treasury)
Streets of Laredo, KH 32286 (Harmony, August 1973), LE 10576 (Columbia, December 1973)
Marty Robbins' Own Favorites (1974), P 12416 (Columbia Special Products)
Marty Robbins Gold (1975), NU 9060 (K-Tel)
All Around Cowboy (1980) P 15594
No. 1 Cowboy (1980), P 15594 (re-release of "All Around Cowboy")
Marty Robbins (1981), GS 4003 (History of Country Music, Sunrise Media)
A Lifetime of Song 1951 - 1982 (August 1983), C2 38870
Memories in Song (1983 - 2 record set), P2 19162 (Columbia Special Product)
The Best Of Marty Robbins (1984), RB4-214-1
The Essential Marty Robbins:1951-1982 (1991), Sony Music Entertainment Inc C2T 48537 CT48538 CT 48539
Marty Robbins Lost and found  (1994), Sony Music Entertainment Inc CT 57695
Marty Robbins Memories in Song (1994), Sony Music Special Products Compact Disc A 19163
Marty Robbins Live Concert Versions Of His Greatest Hits  (1995), Pickwick Group Ltd London England 300382
Under Western Skies  (Oct 1995), Bear Family Records, West Germany 4-CD Box Set BCD 15646
Marty Robbins Legendary Country Singers  (1995), Sony Music Special Products R989-06 PT-25142
Story of My Life: Best of Marty Robbins  (Mar 1996), Sony Music Entertainment Inc Sony CK 64763

Cover versions
Michael Martin Murphey covered the song on his 1993 album Cowboy Songs III. With the Robbins family's blessing, the song was recorded as a duet with Robbins. It was released as a single and peaked at number 62 on the RPM Country Tracks chart in Canada.

Other covers of the song include:
Johnny Cash, in American IV: The Man Comes Around (2002, Vinyl). Also included in Unearthed (2003, Box Set).
Kingfish (1976) by Kingfish
Big Iron (1980) by Lee Conway
Under the Influences (1999) by Mike Ness
Big Iron (2001) by Carol Noonan
Unearthed (2003)  by Johnny Cash
 Colter Wall, in Western Swing & Waltzes (2020)

Notes

References

Western music (North America)
1959 songs
Country ballads
Marty Robbins songs
Johnny Cash songs
Songs written by Marty Robbins
Michael Martin Murphey songs
Columbia Records singles
Internet memes
Internet memes introduced in 2019
1950s ballads
Song recordings produced by Don Law
Fast draw in popular culture